The Loyola Phoenix is the official newspaper of Loyola University Chicago in Chicago, Illinois. It is a student activity independent of the school's journalism program. Published on a weekly basis, it not only serves the students and faculty of the various colleges of the university in the United States and Italy, but it also serves the northside Chicago neighborhoods of Edgewater and Rogers Park and has a readership that extends through the twenty-eight member institutions of the Association of Jesuit Colleges and Universities. Past staff advisors have been affiliated with the Chicago Sun-Times.

 the faculty adviser to the newspaper is Katie Drews, a former investigative reporter at the Better Government Association and the 2008-09 editor-in-chief of The Phoenix.

History
Loyola's student newspaper was founded as the Loyola News in 1924. In 1969, the university sought to take editorial control of Loyola News after the paper criticized the university's administration and the Vietnam War. The writers and staff members responded by shutting down Loyola News, and founding The Loyola Phoenix, which initially operated as an independent business.

Following the newspaper's coverage of an alleged violent beating of a gay man on the CTA Red Line by a then-Loyola student in January 2010, the Phoenix was subpoenaed for their notes regarding the case. Attorneys for the criminal defendant also subpoenaed the Chicago Sun-Times and the Chicago Tribune. In the summer of 2011, however, judge Diane Cannon, blocked the subpoena, which set a new standard for student journalists, entitling them to the same protection as their professional counterparts. The ruling was the first decision in Illinois to apply the law to a student newspaper.

References

External links
 
 Loyola News and Loyola Phoenix at Loyola University Chicago Digital Collections

Newspapers published in Chicago
Loyola University Chicago
Student newspapers published in Illinois
Weekly newspapers published in the United States
Newspapers established in 1924